The 2001–02 season was the 96th season in the existence of RC Strasbourg and the club's first season back in the second division of French football. In addition to the domestic league, Strasbourg competed in this season's edition of the Coupe de France, Coupe de la Ligue and UEFA Cup. The season covered the period from 1 July 2001 to 30 June 2002.

Players

First-team squad

Transfers

In

Out

Competitions

Overall record

French Division 2

League table

Results summary

Results by round

Matches

Coupe de France

Coupe de la Ligue

Trophée des Champions

UEFA Cup

First round

Statistics

Squad statistics

|-
! colspan=14 style=background:#dcdcdc; text-align:center|Goalkeepers

|-
! colspan=14 style=background:#dcdcdc; text-align:center|Defenders

|-
! colspan=14 style=background:#dcdcdc; text-align:center|Midfielders

|-
! colspan=14 style=background:#dcdcdc; text-align:center|Forwards

|-
! colspan=14 style=background:#dcdcdc; text-align:center| Players who have made an appearance or had a squad number this season but have left the club

|}

Goalscorers

References

External links
 The season on racingstub.com

RC Strasbourg Alsace seasons
RC Strasbourg